For the First Time is a 1959 musical film directed by Rudolph Maté and starring Mario Lanza, Johanna von Koczian, Kurt Kasznar, and Zsa Zsa Gabor. It was tenor star Mario Lanza's final film, released by Metro-Goldwyn-Mayer six weeks before his death. The film tells the sentimental story of an operatic tenor (Tony Costa) who finds love for the first time with a young German woman (played by Johanna von Koczian), who happens to be deaf.

It was shot at the Spandau Studios in Berlin and on location in 1958 in Capri, Salzburg, Berlin and at the Rome Opera House. The film's sets were designed by the art directors Hans Jürgen Kiebach, Fritz Maurischat and Heinrich Weidemann.

Reception
Critics singled out Lanza's singing of "Vesti la Giubba" from Pagliacci and the Death Scene from Otello for special praise, with Howard Thompson of The New York Times calling it the tenor's "most disarming vehicle in years."

Cast
 Mario Lanza as Tonio Costa
 Johanna von Koczian as Christa
 Kurt Kasznar as Tabory
 Zsa Zsa Gabor as Gloria De Vadnuz
 Hans Söhnker as Prof. Bruckner 
 Annie Rosar as Mathilde Faktotum 
 Sandro Giglio as Alessandro 
 Walter Rilla as Dr. Bessart 
 Renzo Cesana as Angelo 
 Peter Capell as Leopold Hübner

Box office
According to MGM records the film earned $710,000 in the US and Canada and $975,000 elsewhere, resulting in a profit of $1,685,000.

See also
List of films featuring the deaf and hard of hearing

References

Cesari, Armando. Mario Lanza: An American Tragedy (Fort Worth: Baskerville, 2004).

External links
 
 
 
 
 For the First Time: Lanza's Sweet Little Swansong, by Derek McGovern

1959 films
Metro-Goldwyn-Mayer films
Films about opera
1959 musical films
English-language German films
English-language Italian films
West German films
Titanus films
German musical films
Italian musical films
American musical films
Films directed by Rudolph Maté
Films scored by Georgie Stoll
Films shot at Spandau Studios
1950s English-language films
1950s American films
1950s Italian films
1950s German films